The Men's 400 Freestyle event at the 10th FINA World Aquatics Championships swam on 20 July 2003 in Barcelona, Spain.

Prior to the start of the event, the existing World (WR) and Championship (CR) records were:
WR: 3:40.08 swum by Ian Thorpe (Australia) on 30 July 2002 in Manchester, UK
CR: 3:40.17 swum by Ian Thorpe (Australia) on 22 July 2001 in Fukuoka, Japan

Results

Final

Preliminaries

References

Worlds 2003: Men's 400 Free results from swimrankings.net

Swimming at the 2003 World Aquatics Championships